Elizabeth Percy may refer to:
Elizabeth Mortimer, Lady Percy and Baroness Camoys (1371–1417)
Lady Elizabeth Percy (1395-1436), wife of John Clifford, 7th Baron de Clifford and Ralph Neville, 2nd Earl of Westmorland
Elizabeth Howard Percy, Countess of Northumberland (~1623-1705), née Howard, wife of Algernon Percy, 10th Earl of Northumberland
Elizabeth Capell, Countess of Essex, (1636-1718), née Elizabeth Percy
Elizabeth Percy, Countess of Northumberland (~1646-1690), née Wriothsley, wife of Josceline Percy, 11th Earl of Northumberland
Elizabeth Seymour, Duchess of Somerset (1667-1722), née Elizabeth Percy
Elizabeth Percy, Duchess of Northumberland (1716-1776)
Elizabeth Douglas-Hamilton, Duchess of Hamilton and Brandon (1916-2008), née Elizabeth Percy
Elizabeth Diana Percy, Duchess of Northumberland (1922-2012)